Miettinen is a Finnish surname. Notable people with the surname include:

 Olli Miettinen (1869–1946), Finnish farmer and politician
 Antti Miettinen (born 1980), Finnish professional ice hockey forward
 Camilo Miettinen (born 1986), Colombian-Finnish professional ice hockey forward
 Jorma K. Miettinen (1921–2017), Finnish radiochemist and academician professor
 Kaisa Miettinen (born 1965), Finnish mathematician
 Pauliina Miettinen (born 1972), Finnish female football (soccer) coach and former player
 Paavo Miettinen (1919–1985), Finnish fencer
 Rauno Miettinen (born 1949), Finnish Nordic combined skier
 Sami Miettinen (born 1970), Finnish non-fiction author
 Taisto Miettinen (born 1965), Finnish athlete
 Tommi Miettinen (born 1975), Finnish professional ice hockey centre
 Ville Miettinen (born 1975), Finnish serial entrepreneur and computer programmer
 Yrjö Miettinen (1913–1969), Finnish sports shooter

Finnish-language surnames